Higg's Lock is a lock on the Kennet and Avon Canal, between Kintbury and Newbury, Berkshire,  England.

The lock has a rise/fall of 5 ft 10 in (1.78 m).

References

See also

Locks on the Kennet and Avon Canal

Locks on the Kennet and Avon Canal
Locks of Berkshire